The yellow-rumped warbler (Setophaga coronata) is a regular North American bird species that can be commonly observed all across the continent. Its extensive distribution range connects both the Pacific and Atlantic coasts of the U.S. as well as Canada and Central America, with the population concentrating in the continent's northern parts during the breeding season and migrating southwards to southern North and Central America in Winter. The species generally prefers coniferous forests or mixed coniferous-deciduous forests as its breeding habitat, while during the winter it can be found inhabiting more open areas such as shrublands that offer food resources. The diet of the yellow-rumped warbler is based primarily on insects, though the species does eat fruits such as juniper berries as well, especially in winter. 

The species combines four closely related forms: the eastern myrtle warbler (spp. coronata); its western counterpart, Audubon's warbler (spp. group auduboni); the northwest Mexican black-fronted warbler (spp. nigrifrons); and the Guatemalan Goldman's warbler (spp. goldmani). All subspecies groups of the yellow-rumped warbler are characterized by the yellow rump as its name implies, while intra-group and inter-group variations in appearance exist in spite of many similarities. The myrtle and Audubon's groups, as two major subspecies, are distinguished by noticeable features such as different color of throat, etc.

Etymology

Classification
Since 1973, the American Ornithologists' Union has elected to merge these passerine birds as one species. A 2017 proposal to split the yellow-rumped warbler into separate species failed. In contrast, the International IOC World Bird List v. 10.2 classifies the myrtle, Audubon's, and Goldman's as separate species (Setophaga coronata, Setophaga auduboni, and Setophaga goldmani, respectively), and the black-fronted warbler as a subspecies of S. auduboni. Proper taxonomic treatments remain a matter of debate.

The myrtle form was apparently separated from the others by glaciation during the Pleistocene, and the Audubon's form may have originated more recently through hybridization between the myrtle warbler and the Mexican nigrifrons form.

Distribution

The yellow-rumped warbler breeds from eastern North America west to the Pacific, and southward from there into Western Mexico. "Goldman's" yellow-rumped warbler is a non-migratory endemic within the highlands of Guatemala and the black-fronted warbler is a non-migratory Mexican endemic. The myrtle and Audubon's forms are migratory, traveling to the southern U.S., Mexico, Central America, and the Caribbean for winter.

The breeding area of the myrtle warbler group ranges from Alaska across Canada to Newfoundland, and as far south as the New England region of the U.S. and Virginia, including throughout the northern Great Lakes region. Myrtle warblers migrate south for the winter, ranging from southern British Columbia all the way to Panama and throughout most of the southeastern United States.

Audubon's warbler breeds throughout western North America, coinciding with the Rocky Mountain range, from British Columbia to California and as far east as the Dakotas. Among warblers, the Audubon's is by far the most widespread in North America in winter, being among the last to leave in the fall and among the first to return in spring.

Habitat

Habitat in breeding range 
During the breeding season, the yellow-rumped warbler is generally known to be residing in either exclusively coniferous areas across the North American continent, or mixed coniferous-deciduous habitats where coniferous forests merge with trees like aspen (Populus spp.) and willow (Salix spp.), etc. Many of its habitats in the western U.S. tend to be mountainous, but it can also inhabit places at the sea level as long as there are conifers present—which is the case of its habitats in the Pacific Northwest and the Northeast of the United States. Studies indicate that the yellow-rumped warbler is generally adaptive to changes in its breeding habitat's tree density (usually as a result of selective logging), as its population densities are found to remain largely unaffected in areas where the logging regime leads to decreasing densities of trees; the yellow-rumped warbler is believed to be capable of maintaining its breeding density in habitats as long as there still exists some mature trees, which may be used for nesting. The nest of the Audubon's warbler group is known to have the shape of a deep cup: its frame is built out of twigs, barks, and fiber, etc.; the surrounding rim of the "cup" is woven by softer materials such as grass, hair, and feather, etc., structured in a way to conceal the eggs from predator when parent warblers are absent from the nest.

Habitat in non-breeding range 
During the winter, when the yellow-rumped warbler is not in breeding season, it often inhabit resourceful open areas with shrubs or scattered the trees, that can provide it with some source of food supply, such as bayberries and insects, etc. Open areas preferred by the yellow-rumped warbler may include agricultural and residential areas, secondary forests, and shrublands, etc., these habitats generally do not have very dense vegetation; the species can also inhabit forests that are relatively open, such as mangroves, pine forests, and even coffee plantations, etc. The yellow-rumped warbler tends to have more diversified habitats during the migration process, though it is sometimes found in desert areas of the U.S. southwest, it is more common for the species to inhabit alpine habitats during migration as it tends to arid lowland areas.

Description

The yellow-rumped warbler has an average length of 14 cm and weight of 12.5 g, its appearance is known to be different across its subspecies groups, especially the two major ones: the coronata group (myrtle warbler) and the auduboni group (Audubon's warbler); intra-group variations are also observed. In spite of varying appearances, the yellow rump (as suggested by its name) is present in all subspecies and thus characterizes the yellow-rumped warbler. Within the myrtle warbler group, adult males during the breeding season have gray backs with dark streaks, while females have brown backs in contrast; male and female myrtle warblers can also be distinguished by their different cheek colors, with the former's being black and the latter having brown or gray cheeks. The Audubon's subspecies group is not very dissimilar to the myrtle: in summers, males of both forms have streaked backs of black on slate blue, white wing patches, a streaked breast, and conspicuous yellow patches on the crown, flank, and rump (the latter giving rise to the species's nickname "butter butt" among birdwatchers). Yet the color of the coronata and auduboni groups' throat patches differs and distinguishes them, as the Audubon's warbler sports a yellow throat patch while the myrtle warbler has a white throat and eye stripe, and a contrasting black cheek patch. Females of both forms are more dull, with brown streaking front and back, but still have noticeable yellow rumps. Goldman's warbler, found in Guatemala, resembles Audubon's but has a white lower border to the yellow throat and otherwise darker plumage; males replace the slate blue of Audubon's with black.

Comprising most of the species of the New World warbler family, among the genus Setophaga (formerly Dendroica), the yellow-rumped warbler is a mid-to-large sized species. Although the length is only slightly greater than other Setophaga warblers, it can be mildly to significantly heavier than most other North American species, although blackpoll warblers are slightly larger still.

Behavior

Diet and foraging 
Audubon's and the myrtle are among North America's most abundant neotropical migrants. They are primarily insectivorous. The species is perhaps the most versatile foragers of all warblers. Beyond gleaning from leaves like other New World warblers, they often flit, flycatcher-like, out from their perches in short loops, to catch flying insects. Other places yellow-rumped warblers have been spotted foraging include picking at insects on washed-up seaweed at the beach, skimming insects from the surface of rivers and the ocean, picking them out of spiderwebs, and grabbing them off piles of manure. Common foods include caterpillars and other larvae, leaf beetles, bark beetles, weevils, ants, scale insects, aphids, grasshoppers, caddisflies, craneflies, and gnats, as well as spiders. They also eat spruce budworm, a serious forest pest, during outbreaks.

When bugs are scarce, the myrtle warbler also eats fruit, including the wax-myrtle berries which gave it its name. It is the only warbler able to digest such waxy material. The ability to use these fruits allows it to winter farther north than other warblers, sometimes as far north as Newfoundland. Other commonly eaten fruits may include juniper berries, poison ivy, poison oak, greenbrier, grapes, Virginia creeper and dogwood. They eat wild seeds such as from beach grasses and goldenrod, and they may come to feeders, where they'll take sunflower seeds, raisins, peanut butter, and suet. On their wintering grounds in Mexico they've been seen sipping the sweet honeydew liquid excreted by aphids. Male yellow-rumped warblers tend to forage higher in the trees than females do. While foraging with other warbler species, they sometimes aggressively displace other species, including pine warblers and Blackburnian warblers.

Migratory behaviors 
The yellow-rumped warbler's migratory behaviors vary greatly across different groups and subspecies. Some individuals in Central America, such as in Mexico and Guatemala, migrate only limitedly or do not migrate at all; while individuals in the northern parts of the continent may either choose to migrate all the way towards Central America or winter near their breeding area along the Pacific Coast of the U.S. The species's migratory behaviors are generally nocturnal, as individuals tend to travel at night; accordingly, during the yellow-rumped warbler's migration in spring, it often relies on skylight polarization as a way to navigate and orient at dusk. The general direction of its migratory route maintains southwards during winter, as more individuals are present in Central America and southern parts of North America during the season, while less are observed in the north. Every year, fall migration usually takes place from September to November, spring migration from April to May, and the species known to depart from its winter habitats from March to April. Research shows that before migration, the yellow-rumped warbler intentionally gains weight and accrues more fat in its body: as a preparation for this energy-intensive activity, it consumes more food than other times for the purpose of increasing net energy intake from feeding, along with a refined diet that gives priority to food that supplies more energy.

Nesting and vocal behaviors 
Audubon's and the myrtle nest in coniferous and mixed woodlands, and lay 4–5 eggs. Females build the nest, sometimes using material the male carries to her. The nest is a cup of twigs, pine needles, grasses, and rootlets. She may also use moose, horse, and deer hair, moss, and lichens. She lines this cup with fine hair and feathers, sometimes woven into the nest in such a way that they curl up and over the eggs. The nest takes about 10 days to build. Tree species include hemlock, spruce, white cedar, pine, Douglas-fir, and larch or tamarack. They may build their nests far out on a main branch or tuck it close to the trunk in a secure fork of two or more branches. Occasionally nests are built in a deciduous tree such as a maple, oak or birch. The eggs are incubated for 12 to 13 days. Nestlings are helpless and naked at hatching but grow quickly. The young are brooded for 10 to 14 days, at which point they can fledge.

The yellow-rumped warbler has a trill-like song of 4–7 syllables and an occasional check or chip call note.

References

External links

 Yellow-rumped warbler species account – Cornell Lab of Ornithology
 
 

yellow-rumped warbler
Birds of North America
Birds of the Dominican Republic
yellow-rumped warbler
yellow-rumped warbler